A Perfect 36 is a 1918 American silent comedy film directed by Charles Giblyn, written by Tex Charwate, and starring Mabel Normand and Rod La Rocque. The plot involves Normand's clothes being stolen in a mixup while she was swimming, necessitating her spending most of the film running around naked trying to straighten everything out.

Cast
 Mabel Normand as Mabel
 Rod La Rocque as O.P. Dildock
 Flora Zabelle as Lena
 Leila Romer as Landlady
 Louis R. Grisel as The Constable
 Edward Bernard as Sol Manheimer

Reception
Like many American films of the time, A Perfect 36 was subject to restrictions and cuts by city and state film censorship boards. For example, the Chicago Board of Censors required a cut, in Reel 4, of four closeups of the young woman on the diving board.

References

External links
 
 
  A Perfect 36 in Fandango
  A Perfect 36 in Turner Classic Movies
  A Perfect 36 in The Moving Picture World Magazine
  A Perfect 36 lantern slide  at the Cleveland Public Library Digital Gallery

1918 films
1918 comedy films
Silent American comedy films
American silent feature films
American black-and-white films
Films shot in New York (state)
Goldwyn Pictures films
Films directed by Charles Giblyn
1910s American films